Edwin Lawson James Harris (29 August 1891 – 31 July 1961) was an English cricketer. Harris was a right-handed batsman who bowled right-arm medium pace. He was born at Littlehampton, Sussex.

Harris made his first-class debut for Sussex against Northamptonshire at the County Ground, Hove, in the 1922 County Championship. He made eight further first-class appearances for the county, the last of which came against Cambridge University in 1924. In his nine first-class matches, he scored 208 runs at an average of 14.85, with a high score of 51 not out. This score was his only half century and came against Cambridge University in 1924. With the ball, he took 3 wickets at a bowling average of 19.66, with best figures of 2/3.

He died at East Preston, Sussex, on 31 July 1961. His father, Henry, also played first-class cricket.

References

External links
Edwin Harris at ESPNcricinfo
Edwin Harris at CricketArchive

1891 births
1961 deaths
People from Littlehampton
English cricketers
Sussex cricketers
People from East Preston, West Sussex